Frederic James "Eric" Allpass (21 September 1889 - 5 April 1977) was a member of the Queensland Legislative Assembly.

Biography
Allpass was born in Warwick, Queensland, the son of Frederic William Allpass and his wife Isabel Jane (née Merry). He was educated at Laidley State School and on leaving school became a dairy farmer and grazier.

On the 21 November 1921 Allpass married Florence Marian Guille and together had a son and two daughters. He died in April 1977 at Toowoomba.

Public career
At the 1950 Queensland state election, Allpass won the new seat of Condamine for the Country Party, easily defeating his Labor opponent, Michael Lyons. In 1953 however, the new Labor candidate, Les Diplock, turned the tables and defeated Allpass.

References

Members of the Queensland Legislative Assembly
1889 births
1977 deaths
20th-century Australian politicians